The London Post Office Railway 1962 Stock was a type of prototype rolling stock built by English Electric in 1962. Two units were built as prototypes for a possible new design of stock. Although the new design for which the two units were built wasn't adopted, several of the design features used by the 1962 Stock were later incorporated into the 1980 Stock.

Two sets were built, numbered 1 and 2. The first set was withdrawn in 1967 after just five years of service, and was eventually scrapped. The second set lasted until 1980 when it was withdrawn due to damage, however it was later repaired using parts from its scrapped sister and returned to service, with it being renumbered to 66 afterwards.

This unit was withdrawn in 2003 when the London Post Office Railway system closed.

The 1962 Stock, like all other stock used on the London Post Office Railway, travels on  gauge track within a custom loading gauge while being powered via a third rail system using 440 V DC electrification.

 1962